Slovenia is Ours is a Slovenian regionalist political party, active in the Slovenian Littoral. It is composed by three local parties, active in Slovenian Istria, namely 'Koper is Ours' (led by the mayor of Koper Boris Popovič), 'Izola is Ours' (led by the mayor of Izola Tomislav Klokočovnik), and 'Piran is Ours', led by the mayor Tomaž Gantar.

At the 2004 parliamentary election, the party won 2.6% of the popular vote and no seats. It did not participate in the 2008 parliamentary election. As of September 2008, its leader was Boris Popovič, the mayor of Koper. The party did not participate in the early 2011 Slovenian parliamentary election on 4 December 2011.

References

2004 establishments in Slovenia
Political parties established in 2004
Political parties in Slovenia
Regionalist parties
Subnational political parties
Slovene Littoral